Squadron Leader Avani Chaturvedi (born 27 October 1993) is an Indian pilot from Rewa district, Madhya Pradesh. She was declared as the first woman combat pilot along with two of her cohorts, Mohana Singh Jitarwal, and Bhawana Kanth. The trio was inducted into the Indian Air Force fighter squadron in June 2016. They were formally commissioned by then Defence Minister Manohar Parrikar on 18 June 2016, to serve the nation.

Early life and education 

Avani was born on 27 October in 1993. Her father, Dinkar Chaturvedi, is a superintending engineer in Water Resource Department of  Madhya Pradesh government and her mother is a home maker. She completed her  schooling from Deolond, a small town in Shahdol district of Madhya Pradesh. Completing her Bachelors in Technology from Banasthali University, Rajasthan in 2014 where she joined the college's flying club which fascinated her to fly. She passed the AFCAT and further was recommended by AFSB.

Avani's elder brother, who is an officer in the Indian Army, inspired her to join the Indian Air Force. She also has a few hours of flying experience in the flying club of her college Banasthali University.

Career 
She was selected for training at the Air Force Academy and completed the training at the age of 25. After further training, Chaturvedi became a fighter pilot in June 2016.

In 2018, Chaturvedi became the first Indian woman pilot to take a solo flight in a MiG-21. In 2018 Avani was promoted to the rank of Flight Lieutenant. In 2023, she became the first woman fighter pilot of the Indian Air Force to take part in an aerial wargame abroad, which she did in Japan.

Chaturvedi is posted in Indian Air Force No. 23 Squadron Panthers in Suratgarh, Rajasthan.

Awards and recognition
In 2018, she was honored with the doctorate degree from Banasthali Vidyapeeth.

On 9 March 2020, Chaturvedi was awarded with Nari Shakti Puraskar by President Ram Nath Kovind.

Personal life
Avni Chaturvedi married Flight Lieutenant Vineet Chikara in November 2019.

See also 
 Gunjan Saxena
 Mohana Singh Jitarwal
 Bhawana Kanth

References

External links 
 Women Fighter Pilots. Veer by Discovery

Living people
Indian women aviators
Women from Madhya Pradesh
Indian women in war
Nari Shakti Puraskar winners
Indian Air Force officers
1993 births